Curtiss-Robertson Airplane Manufacturing Company  was an American aircraft manufacturer formed to build the Curtiss Robin aircraft.

The company was founded on November 9, 1927, with a funding of $500,000. Initial production of its Curtiss Robin aircraft was at a factory in Garden City, Long Island. Production moved to St. Louis on August 7, 1928. On August 29, 1929, Curtiss had fully integrated Robertson into its business. In 1930, Travel Air was integrated into Curtiss-Robertson. In 1933, the company had fully merged with Curtiss-Wright with Robertson leaving.

Aircraft

References

Bibliography

Defunct aircraft manufacturers of the United States